Hypersexuality is extremely frequent or suddenly increased libido. It is controversial whether it should be included as a clinical diagnosis used by mental healthcare professionals. Nymphomania and satyriasis were terms previously used for the condition in women and men, respectively.

Hypersexuality may be a primary condition, or the symptom of another medical disease or condition; for example, Klüver–Bucy syndrome or bipolar disorder. Hypersexuality may also present as a side effect of medication such as drugs used to treat Parkinson's disease. Clinicians have yet to reach a consensus over how best to describe hypersexuality as a primary condition, or to determine the appropriateness of describing such behaviors and impulses as a separate pathology.

Hypersexual behaviors are viewed variously by clinicians and therapists as a type of obsessive-compulsive disorder (OCD) or "OCD-spectrum disorder", an addiction, or a disorder of impulsivity. A number of authors do not acknowledge such a pathology and instead assert that the condition merely reflects a cultural dislike of exceptional sexual behavior.

Consistent with there not being any consensus over what causes hypersexuality, authors have used many different labels to refer to it, sometimes interchangeably, but often depending on which theory they favor or which specific behavior they were studying. Contemporary names include compulsive masturbation, compulsive sexual behavior, cybersex addiction, erotomania, "excessive sexual drive", hyperphilia, hypersexuality, hypersexual disorder, problematic hypersexuality, sexual addiction, sexual compulsivity, sexual dependency, sexual impulsivity, "out of control sexual behavior", and paraphilia-related disorder.

Causes
There is little consensus among experts as to the causes of hypersexuality. Some research suggests that some cases can be linked to biochemical or physiological changes that accompany dementia, as dementia can lead to disinhibition. Psychological needs also complicate the biological explanation, which identifies the temporal/frontal lobe of the brain as the area for regulating libido. Injuries to this part of the brain increase the risk of aggressive behavior and other behavioral problems including personality changes and socially inappropriate sexual behavior such as hypersexuality. The same symptom can occur after unilateral temporal lobotomy. There are other biological factors that are associated with hypersexuality such as premenstrual changes, and the exposure to virilising hormones in childhood or in utero.

Physiology 
In research involving the use of antiandrogens to reduce undesirable sexual behaviour such as hypersexuality, testosterone has been found to be necessary, but not sufficient, for sexual drive. Other proposed factors include a lack of physical closeness and forgetfulness of the recent past.

Pathogenic overactivity of the dopaminergic mesolimbic pathway in the brain—forming either psychiatrically, during mania, or pharmacologically, as a side effect of dopamine agonists, specifically D3-preferring agonists—is associated with various addictions and has been shown to result among some in overindulgent, sometimes hypersexual, behavior. HPA axis dysregulation has been associated with hypersexual disorder.

The American Association for Sex Addiction Therapy acknowledges biological factors as contributing causes of sex addiction. Other associated factors include psychological components (which affect mood and motivation as well as psychomotor and cognitive functions), spiritual control, mood disorders, sexual trauma, and intimacy anorexia as causes or type of sex addiction.

As a symptom
Hypersexuality is known to present itself as a symptom in connection to a number of mental and neurological disorders. Some people with borderline personality disorder (sometimes referred to as BPD) can be markedly impulsive, seductive, and extremely sexual. Sexual promiscuity, sexual obsessions, and hypersexuality are very common symptoms for both men and women with BPD. On occasion for some there can be extreme forms of paraphilic drives and desires. "Borderline" patients, due in the opinion of some to the use of splitting, experience love and sexuality in unstable ways.

People with bipolar disorder may often display tremendous swings in sex drive depending on their mood. As defined in the DSM-IV-TR, hypersexuality can be a symptom of hypomania or mania in bipolar disorder or schizoaffective disorder. Pick's disease causes damage to the temporal/frontal lobe of the brain; people with Pick's disease show a range of socially inappropriate behaviors.

Several neurological conditions such as Alzheimer's disease, autism, ADHD, various types of brain injury, Klüver–Bucy syndrome, Kleine–Levin syndrome, and many more neurodegenerative diseases can cause hypersexual behavior. Sexually inappropriate behavior has been shown to occur in 7–8% of Alzheimer's patients living at home, at a care facility or in a hospital setting. Hypersexuality has also been reported to result as a side-effect of some medications used to treat Parkinson's disease. Some recreationally used drugs, such as methamphetamine, may also contribute to hypersexual behavior.

A positive link between the severity of dementia and occurrence of inappropriate behavior has also been found. Hypersexuality can be caused by dementia in a number of ways, including disinhibition due to organic disease, misreading of social cues, understimulation, the persistence of learned sexual behavior after other behaviours have been lost, and the side-effects of the drugs used to treat dementia. Other possible causes of dementia-related hypersexuality include an inappropriately expressed psychological need for intimacy and forgetfulness of the recent past. As this illness progresses, increasing hypersexuality has been theorized to sometimes compensate for declining self-esteem and cognitive function.

Symptoms of hypersexuality are also similar to those of sexual addiction in that they embody similar traits. These symptoms include the inability to be intimate (intimacy anorexia), depression and bipolar disorders. The resulting hypersexuality may have an impact in the person's social and occupational domains if the underlying symptoms have a large enough systemic influence.

As a disorder

, a proposal to add Sexual Addiction to the Diagnostic and Statistical Manual of Mental Disorders (DSM) system has failed to get support of the American Psychiatric Association (APA). The DSM does include an entry called Sexual Disorder Not Otherwise Specified (Sexual Disorder NOS) to apply to, among other conditions, "distress about a pattern of repeated sexual relationships involving a succession of lovers who are experienced by the individual only as things to be used".

The International Statistical Classification of Diseases and Related Health Problems (ICD-10) of the World Health Organization (WHO), includes two relevant entries. One is "Excessive Sexual Drive" (coded F52.7), which is divided into satyriasis for males and nymphomania for females. The other is "Excessive Masturbation" or "Onanism (excessive)" (coded F98.8).

In 1988, Levine and Troiden questioned whether it makes sense to discuss hypersexuality at all, arguing that labeling sexual urges "extreme" merely stigmatizes people who do not conform to the norms of their culture or peer group, and that sexual compulsivity be a myth. However, and in contrast to this view, 30 years later in 2018, the ICD-11 created a new condition classification, compulsive sexual behavior, to cover "a persistent pattern of failure to control intense, repetitive sexual impulses or urges resulting in repetitive sexual behaviour". It classifies this "failure to control" as an abnormal mental health condition.

Treatment
Hypersexuality may negatively impact an individual. The concept of hypersexuality as an addiction was started in the 1970s by former members of Alcoholics Anonymous who felt they experienced a similar lack of control and compulsivity with sexual behaviors as with alcohol.

Multiple 12-step style self-help groups now exist for people who identify as sex addicts, including Sex Addicts Anonymous, Sexaholics Anonymous, Sex and Love Addicts Anonymous, and Sexual Compulsives Anonymous. Some hypersexual men may treat their condition with the usage of medication (such as Cyproterone acetate) or consuming foods considered to be anaphrodisiacs. Other hypersexuals may choose a route of consultation, such as psychotherapy, self-help groups or counselling.

Terminology
The Merriam-Webster Dictionary defines hypersexual as "exhibiting unusual or excessive concern with or indulgence in sexual activity". Sexologists have been using the term hypersexuality since the late 1800s, when Krafft-Ebing described several cases of extreme sexual behaviours in his seminal 1886 book, Psychopathia Sexualis. The author used the term "hypersexuality" to describe conditions that would now be termed premature ejaculation. Terms to describe males with the condition include donjuanist, satyromaniac, satyriac and satyriasist, for women clitoromaniac, nympho and nymphomaniac, for teleiophilic (attracted to adults) heterosexual women andromaniac, while hypersexualist, sexaholic, onanist, hyperphiliac and erotomaniac are gender neutral terms.

Other, mostly historical, names include Don Juanism, the Messalina complex, sexaholism, hyperlibido and furor uterinus.

See also

 Erotophilia
 Persistent genital arousal disorder
 Pornography addiction
 Sexual Compulsivity Scale
 Hypersexual disorder

References

External links

 WikiSaurus:libidinist

Sexual dysfunctions
Casual sex
Human sexuality
Sexual addiction
Sexual arousal
Sexual health
Sexuality